Kevin Shoebridge is a New Zealand sailor who has sailed in multiple Volvo Ocean Races and America's Cups.

In the 1985–86 Whitbread Round the World Race, Shoebridge sailed on board Lion New Zealand.

In 1987, Shoebridge joined the New Zealand Challenge for the America's Cup and sailed on board KZ 7 in the 1987 Louis Vuitton Cup.

He then returned to sail the 1989–90 Whitbread Round the World Race as a watch leader, on eventual winner Steinlager 2, before winning the 1993–94 Whitbread Round the World Race on NZ Endeavour.

Shoebridge then joined Team New Zealand and was part of the crew on NZL 32 when it won the 1995 America's Cup. He later sailed the 1997–98 Whitbread Round the World Race as a watch captain on Merit Cup.

He skippered Team Tyco in the 2000 Sydney to Hobart Yacht Race and the 2001–02 Volvo Ocean Race, placing fourth in both races. He joined America's OneWorld challenge in the 2003 Louis Vuitton Cup as a trimmer before rejoining Team New Zealand for the 2007 America's Cup as the sailing and operations manager.

He was the Chief Operating Officer for Camper Lifelovers in the 2011–12 Volvo Ocean Race. Before being appointed as Team New Zealand's Chief Operating Officer for their successful 2017 America's Cup challenge.

Shoebridge remained as the COO of Emirates Team New Zealand for the successful defense of the 2021 36th America's Cup, in Auckland, New Zealand.

References

Living people
New Zealand male sailors (sport)
Team New Zealand sailors
Volvo Ocean Race sailors
Volvo Ocean 60 class sailors
2003 America's Cup sailors
1995 America's Cup sailors
1987 America's Cup sailors
1992 America's Cup sailors
Year of birth missing (living people)